is a railway station in the town of Kamiichi, Nakaniikawa District, Toyama Prefecture, Japan, operated by the private railway operator Toyama Chihō Railway.

Lines

Station layout 
The station has one ground-level side platform serving a single bi-directional track. The station is unattended.

History
It was rebated to its present name on 20 February 1921.

Adjacent stations

Surrounding area 
Miyakawa Elementary School

See also
 List of railway stations in Japan

External links

 

Railway stations in Toyama Prefecture
Railway stations in Japan opened in 1913
Stations of Toyama Chihō Railway
Kamiichi, Toyama